Robert V. Kohn (born in 1953) is an American mathematician working on partial differential equations, calculus of variations, mathematical materials science, and mathematical finance. He is a professor at the Courant Institute of Mathematical Sciences, New York University.

Biography 

Kohn studied mathematics at Harvard University, obtaining his bachelor's degree in 1974. He obtained his Ph.D. at Princeton University in 1979, as a student of Frederick Almgren.

Work 

Kohn is best known for his work on non-linear partial differential equations, including work with Louis Nirenberg and Luis Caffarelli in which they obtained partial results about the regularity of weak solutions of the Navier–Stokes equations.

Honors

He received a Sloan Research Fellowship in 1984. In 2006, he was a plenary speaker at the International Congress of Mathematicians, in Madrid (Energy driven pattern formation). He is a fellow of the American Mathematical Society. He is an elected member of American Academy of Arts and Sciences.

Selected publications 
with L. Caffarelli and L. Nirenberg: "Partial regularity of suitable weak solutions of the Navier–Stokes equations", Communications on Pure and Applied Mathematics, n. 35 i. 6, pp. 771–831.
with L. Caffarelli and L. Nirenberg, "First order interpolation inequalities with weights", Compositio Mathematica n. 53 i. 3, pp. 259–275.
with Gilbert Strang, "Optimal design and relaxation of variational problems, I", Communications on Pure and Applied Mathematics, n. 39 i. 1, pp. 113–137.

References

External links 
Robert V. Kohn website

20th-century American mathematicians
1953 births
Sloan Research Fellows
Fellows of the American Mathematical Society
Harvard University alumni
Princeton University alumni
Living people
Courant Institute of Mathematical Sciences faculty